Bolandu (also Romanized as Bolandū and Bolandoo; also known as Bilandu) is a village in Tazian Rural District, in the Central District of Bandar Abbas County, Hormozgan Province, Iran. At the 2006 census, its population was 1,008, in 214 families.

References 

Populated places in Bandar Abbas County